Engerdal Church is a parish church of the Church of Norway in Engerdal Municipality in Innlandet county, Norway. It is located in the village of Engerdal. It is the church for the Engerdal parish which is part of the Sør-Østerdal prosti (deanery) in the Diocese of Hamar. The white, wooden church was built in a long church design in 1873 using plans drawn up by an unknown architect. The church seats about 250 people.

History

The first church in Engerdal was built in 1871–1873. Johan Olsen from Elverum and Teodor Embretsen Nordvi from Trysil were responsible for the carpentry work. The new church was a timber-framed long church. The altarpiece was painted by teacher Peder Haugen from Haugen in Engerdal. The church building was consecrated in 1873.

See also
List of churches in Hamar

References

Engerdal
Churches in Innlandet
Long churches in Norway
Wooden churches in Norway
19th-century Church of Norway church buildings
Churches completed in 1873
1873 establishments in Norway